Pedro Duque de Rivera (died December 1594) was a Roman Catholic prelate who was appointed Bishop of Panamá (1594).

Biography
Pedro Duque de Rivera was born in Spain and ordained a priest in the Society of Jesus in Seville. He went to Santo Domingo where he served as dean of the Cathedral of Santa María la Menor. On July 27, 1594, Pope Clement VIII, appointed him Bishop of Panamá. On October 2, 1594, he was consecrated bishop by Nicolás de Ramos y Santos, Archbishop of Santo Domingo. He died in December 1594 in Cartagena.

References

External links and additional sources
 (for Chronology of Bishops) 
 (for Chronology of Bishops) 

Bishops appointed by Pope Clement VIII
Jesuit bishops
1594 deaths
16th-century Roman Catholic bishops in Panama
Roman Catholic bishops of Panamá